Lyncoya Jackson (also known as Lincoyer) lived from c. 1811 to July 1, 1828. He was a Creek Indian child adopted and raised by U.S. President Andrew Jackson and his wife, Rachel Jackson. Born to Creek (Muscogee/Red Stick) parents, he was orphaned during the Creek War after the Battle of Tallushatchee. Lyncoya was brought to Jackson after the surviving women in the village refused to care for him because they were severely injured. Jackson took pity on the orphan and wrote that he felt an "unusual sympathy" for the child, perhaps because of Jackson's own past as an orphan. He called him a savage that fortune brought to him.  Deciding to protect him, Jackson sent him along to be raised by his wife while he continued to lead his army.

Lyncoya was brought to the Jackson home, the Hermitage, in 1813. He was educated along with Andrew Jackson's first adopted son, Andrew Jackson Jr., and Jackson even had aspirations to send him to the U.S. Military Academy at West Point, but that proved impossible. Instead, Lyncoya was apprenticed to be a saddle maker and stayed at the Hermitage until he died of tuberculosis in 1828. He was 16 at the time.

References

Sources

1810s births
1828 deaths
19th-century Native Americans
19th-century American people
19th-century deaths from tuberculosis
Children of presidents of the United States
American adoptees
Muscogee people
Year of birth uncertain
Andrew Jackson family
Native American people from Tennessee
Tuberculosis deaths in Tennessee